This is a list of colleges and universities in Bacolod, Philippines.

Universities

State universities

C
Carlos Hilado Memorial State University

Private non-sectarian universities

S
STI West Negros University

Private Catholic universities

U
University of Negros Occidental – Recoletos
University of Saint La Salle

Colleges

Local colleges

B
Bacolod City College

N
Negros Occidental Language and Information Technology Center

Private Catholic colleges

C
Colegio San Agustin – Bacolod
La Consolacion College Bacolod

Private national colleges

A
ABE International Business College – Bacolod Campus
AMA Computer College – Bacolod Campus

C
College of Arts & Sciences of Asia & the Pacific – Bacolod Campus

M
Mapúa Malayan Digital College – Learning Hub Bacolod

Other private colleges

A
Asian College of Aeronautics – Bacolod Branch (Main Campus)

B
Bacolod Christian College of Negros

J
John B. Lacson Colleges Foundation – Bacolod

L
LaSalTech Inc.

O
Our Lady of Mercy College – Bacolod

R
Riverside College, Inc.

V
VMA Global College
Victory Business College, Inc.

External links
Colleges and Universities: Official website of the Bacolod City local government

 
Bacolod